The Rose d'Or ('Golden Rose') is an international awards festival in entertainment broadcasting and programming. The European Broadcasting Union (EBU) first acquired the Rose d’Or in 1961, when it was created by Swiss Television in the lakeside city of Montreux. The awards stayed with the EBU for almost 40 years. The EBU re-acquired the awards in 2013 and successfully re-launched the event that year in Brussels, then relocated to Berlin from 2014 to 2018.

In 2014 the event took place on 17 September in Berlin, Germany. For the first time in its 53-year history, the competition categories were extended to include radio and online video programmes in addition to the traditional focus on television. Producers, executives from independent and public service broadcasters and heads of production companies from several countries took part.

In 2019 the EBU partnered with international publishing company and digital channels business C21Media to take over the organisation of the Rose d’Or Awards. The 60th Rose d’Or was held virtually in November 2021.

Format
Categories for the 2020 awards:
 Comedy: scripted and non-scripted comedy shows including sketch shows, panel, improvisation, clips, comedy specials and stand-up. Series or single programmes.
 Comedy Drama and Sitcom: scripted comedy series or one-off dramas, involving regular characters in various situations.
 Drama: scripted series or one-off dramas involving characters in various situations. A main plot can be resolved within a single episode or over a series.
 Soap or Telenovela: best multi-episode popular drama or melodrama, either on-going or limited run.
 Reality and Factual Entertainment: programmes or series in which a situation or topic is treated or created through real people or which tell their story by following real-life characters.
 Arts: programmes or series featuring performing arts and cultural programmes,  stage recordings and television adaptations of performing arts or documentaries dedicated to art forms or artists.
 Documentary: factual programme or series providing in-depth analysis of a specific subject or point of view supported by evidence and informed commentary, on any subject other than the Arts.
 Studio Entertainment: studio-based game shows, variety shows,  event series and specials.
 Children and Youth: all genres produced for children and youth older than 6 years. Series or single programmes will be considered.
 Social Media Video Series: original fiction or non-fiction short-form video series, (under a half an hour duration) that premiere on social, web, mobile and video platforms.
 Audio Entertainment: scripted or unscripted original podcast, audio-first books and radio shows. Entries accepted from producers, platforms, distributors or talent.
 Innovation in the time of Covid: Award for the programme or series, that, against all the odds, defined what television can achieve – and how television can be produced – in a time of unprecedented crisis.

In addition, the Rose d’Or recognises significant individual achievements by awarding one trophy each for:
 Emerging Talent Award: the Organiser, in consultation with the panel of judges, will present this award to a new talent who has made a breakthrough performance in a programme or series in the past year. 
 Performance of the Year: the Organiser, in consultation with the panel of judges, will present this award to a personality who has made an outstanding performance in a programme or series in the past year.
 Lifetime Achievement: the Organiser, in consultation with the panel of judges will award the Lifetime Achievement to a personality who has made an outstanding and extensive contribution to the world of entertainment including, but not exclusively, their work in television, audio or online media.

The ultimate accolade for a programme or series, The Golden Rose, awarded to the programme, series or individual that, in the opinion of the judges, has made the outstanding contribution of 2020.

History
The festival was founded by Marcel Bezençon, who was inspired by the need of what was then a small group of international colleagues to find programmes to fill their summer schedules. He had the idea that Switzerland could produce an entertainment programme, which could then be swapped with programmes from other national broadcasters. The festival was held in the spring to have programmes ready for broadcast in the summer, and the Golden Rose awards established as an extra incentive. As the festival grew, programme swaps ceased to be viable and the concept of the Film Kiosk was born. The awards became an important part of European television culture, and Golden Rose winners usually receive publicity in their home countries.

Golden Rose winners

1961–2003

2004

2005

2006

2007

2008

2009

2010

2012

2013

2014

2015

2016

2017

2018

2019

2020

2021

2022 

Source:

References

External links

Television awards
Radio awards
Television in Switzerland
Awards established in 1961
European Broadcasting Union